In enzymology, a 2-enoate reductase is an enzyme that catalyzes the chemical reaction

butanoate + NAD+  2-butenoate + NADH + H+

Thus, the two substrates of this enzyme are butanoate and NAD+, whereas its 3 products are 2-butenoate, NADH, and H+.

This enzyme belongs to the family of oxidoreductases, specifically those acting on the CH-CH group of donor with NAD+ or NADP+ as acceptor.  The systematic name of this enzyme class is butanoate:NAD+ Delta2-oxidoreductase. This enzyme is also called enoate reductase.  This enzyme participates in phenylalanine metabolism.  It has 4 cofactors: FAD, Iron, Sulfur,  and Iron-sulfur.

References

 

EC 1.3.1
NADH-dependent enzymes
Flavoproteins
Iron enzymes
Sulfur enzymes
Iron-sulfur enzymes
Enzymes of unknown structure